Yianna may refer to:

 Yianna Katsoulos, European-American singer
 Yianna Stavrous, singer
 Yianna Olymbiou, actress at the Lemos Theater
 SS John Stagg, named Yianna from 1961 to 1968

See also 
 Gianna
Joanna
Yannis
Ioannis

Greek feminine given names